Spirodecane is a chemical compound. It features a cyclohexane ring bound directly to a cyclopentane ring.

Azaspirodecane is an analogue in which the cyclohexane group has been replaced with a piperidine.

See also 
 Azaspirodecane

Spiro compounds
Cyclopentanes